German submarine U-713 was a Type VIIC U-boat of Nazi Germany's Kriegsmarine during World War II. The submarine was laid down on 21 October 1941 at the H. C. Stülcken Sohn yard at Hamburg, launched on 24 September 1942, and commissioned on 29 December 1942 under the command of Oberleutnant zur See Henri Gosejacob.

Attached to 8th U-boat Flotilla based at Danzig, U-713 completed her training period on 30 June 1943 and was assigned to front-line service.

Design
German Type VIIC submarines were preceded by the shorter Type VIIB submarines. U-713 had a displacement of  when at the surface and  while submerged. She had two shafts and two  propellers.

U-713 was fitted with five  torpedo tubes (four fitted at the bow and one at the stern), fourteen torpedoes, one  SK C/35 naval gun, 220 rounds, and two twin  C/30 anti-aircraft guns. The boat had a complement of between forty-four and sixty.

Service history

Fate
U-713 was missing since 24 February 1944 in the Norwegian Sea north-west of Narvik.

Previously recorded fate
The destroyer HMS Keppel was directed towards the U-boat and attacked with depth charges, sinking U-713 in position .

References

Bibliography

External links

World War II submarines of Germany
German Type VIIC submarines
1942 ships
Ships built in Hamburg
U-boats commissioned in 1942
U-boats sunk in 1944
Missing U-boats of World War II
Maritime incidents in February 1945
World War II shipwrecks in the Norwegian Sea